Gabriel Bandeira (born 29 October 1999) is a Brazilian Paralympic swimmer. He represented Brazil at the 2020 Summer Paralympics.

Career
Bandeira made his international debut for Brazil at the 2020 World Para Swimming European Open Championships. He won six gold medals in six races and improved his own Americas record eight times during the week in Portugal.

Bandeira represented Brazil at the 2020 Summer Paralympics where he won a gold medal in the 100 metre butterfly S14 and a silver medal in the 200 metre freestyle events.

References

1999 births
Living people
Medalists at the World Para Swimming European Championships
Paralympic swimmers of Brazil
Swimmers at the 2020 Summer Paralympics
Medalists at the 2020 Summer Paralympics
Paralympic gold medalists for Brazil
Paralympic silver medalists for Brazil
Paralympic medalists in swimming
Brazilian male butterfly swimmers
Brazilian male freestyle swimmers
Brazilian male medley swimmers
Brazilian male breaststroke swimmers
S14-classified Paralympic swimmers
Medalists at the World Para Swimming Championships
21st-century Brazilian people
People from Indaiatuba